Frank Hodges (30 April 1887 – 3 June 1947) was an English trade union leader, who became General Secretary of the Miners' Federation of Great Britain. A Member of Parliament (MP) for one year, he was Civil Lord of the Admiralty in the first Labour Government.

Early life
Hodges was born in Woolaston in Gloucestershire in 1887, but moved to Wales at a young age. At the age of 14 he was working at the Powell Tillery Pit in Abertillery, and due to his desire to read, he came to the attention of one of the mining officials, who sponsored him to attend night school. At the age of sixteen, inspired by the preacher Evan Roberts, he became a Methodist and was soon preaching in the evenings. Like many trade unionists before him, he found his religious beliefs tied into the plight of the coal-miners, and joined the Trade Union movement. At the same time his political views led him to become a member of the Independent Labour Party.

At the age of eighteen, Hodges heard Philip Snowden addressing a crowd. He found Snowden inspirational and from that moment he saw the politician as his 'ideal'. Hodges was also shaped by the views of the Welsh syndicalist Noah Ablett, whose Plebs' League he later joined. Through his trade union links, Hodges secured a scholarship to Ruskin College, Oxford, and spent two years there from 1909. Although many of the students from Ruskin were not treated with the same equality as those at other Oxford colleges, Hodges found the life away from the coal mines to be to his liking, describing it as the great time of his life. In 1911, after the end of his studies, Hodges spent a brief time in Paris, where he stayed with the Marxist Paul Lafargue and his wife Laura Marx, only a few months before their joint suicide.

Political and union career
After leaving Oxford, Hodges returned to work in the mines. After his time at Oxford he found the manual work as a hewer unbearable and attempted to find more intellectual work. He answered an advertisement for a job as a trade union agent, and was accepted as the Garw district representative of the South Wales Miners' Federation. Now twenty four, Hodges was in a career where he felt he could change the lives of others for the better, and started reforming his district's organisation. His work as a union agent was rewarded when in 1919 he became the Permanent Secretary of the Miners' Federation of Great Britain. In this role he negotiated terms and conditions for the mining industry with the Government which included meetings with Lloyd George.

In 1921, The South Wales Miners' Federation called for strike action after the coalowners demanded a reduction in wages from the miners. The miners rejected the terms and were locked out. The Miners' Federation called upon the aid of the Triple Alliance and a strike was called for 12 April. While preparations were taking place for the strike, the leaders of the Triple Alliance pushed the strike back to 15 April; in the interim, Hodges approached MPs independently in the hope of securing a temporary solution. When asked by the MPs if the miners would accept a wage that would not fall below the cost of living, Hodges stated that "any such offer...would receive very serious consideration". This action was seen as an act of betrayal by the miners' executive and Hodges lost the support of his own union. The Alliance fell apart and many unions withdrew their support, leaving the workers in an impossible situation as solidarity broke down; the event became known as 'Black Friday'.

In 1923, Hodges ran for political office, as Member of Parliament for Lichfield as a Labour candidate. He won the seat becoming part of the first Labour Government, under the leadership of
Ramsay MacDonald and was given the office of First Lord of the Admiralty. It was during his period as a Member of Parliament that Hodges was invited to the Rhondda to play at Ton Pentre golf club in a game with the Duke of York before he became King George VI.

Now a government minister, and seen as an increasing moderate, the Miners' Federation took the opportunity to replace Hodges as Secretary. Hodges understood his position was no longer secure and resigned before he was pushed out. His replacement was the far more radical Arthur Cook from the Rhondda district. The next year, Hodges left his political post and was appointed a member of the Central Electricity Board in 1926.

Written works
 Nationalisation of the mines (1920) pub. Leonard Parsons, London (available online at openlibarary.org)
 My adventures as a labour leader (1924) pub. G Newnes

References

Sources

External links 

  

1887 births
1947 deaths
General Secretaries of the National Union of Mineworkers (Great Britain)
Alumni of Ruskin College
UK MPs 1923–1924
English political writers
English Methodists
English miners
Labour Party (UK) MPs for English constituencies
Miners' Federation of Great Britain-sponsored MPs
Trade unionists from Gloucestershire
Lords of the Admiralty
People from Forest of Dean District
Members of the Parliament of the United Kingdom for Lichfield